This article lists all the confirmed national football squads for the UEFA Women's Euro 2009.

Players marked (c) were named as captain for their national squad.

Group A

Head coach:  Kenneth Heiner-Møller

Head coach:  Michael Käld

Head coach:  Vera Pauw

* goals and caps at dec. 2020. The rest at career end.

Head coach:  Anatoliy Kutsev

Group B

Head coach:  Silvia Neid

Head coach:  Bruno Bini

Head coach:  Sigurður Ragnar Eyjólfsson

Head coach:  Bjarne Berntsen

Group C

Head coach:  Hope Powell

Head coach:  Pietro Ghedin

Head coach:  Igor Shalimov

Head coach:  Thomas Dennerby

References

External links
 2009 - Match Details at RSSSF.com

Squads
2009